Hollenfels is a village in the commune of Tuntange, in western Luxembourg.  , the village has a population of 238.

Hollenfels is famous for the huge keep of its imposing medieval castle overlooking the valley below.

References

Mersch (canton)
Villages in Luxembourg

de:Burg Hollenfels